The 1932 Motueka by-election was a by-election in the New Zealand electorate of Motueka, a rural seat at the top of the South Island.

The by-election occurred on 1 December 1932, and was precipitated by the suicide of sitting Independent member of parliament George Black on 17 October 1932.

The by-election was contested by Keith Holyoake (Reform Party candidate for the United/Reform Coalition), Paddy Webb (Labour Party), and 80 year old Roderick McKenzie, ex-MP for Motueka (1896–1914) standing as Independent Liberal–Labour.

1931 general election result

1932 by-election result
The following table gives the election results:

References

Motueka 1932
1932 elections in New Zealand
Motueka
December 1932 events
Politics of the Tasman District